Ferrybank may refer to:

 Ferrybank, Waterford, Ireland, a suburb of Waterford City
 Ferrybank, Wexford, Ireland, a townland near Wexford Town